Matthew Carl Ferguson (born in Conyers, Georgia) is an American country music singer and songwriter known professionally as Matt Kennon. He has co-written a song for Randy Travis and has released one album for BamaJam Records. This album includes the top 40 hit "The Call".

Biography
Matthew Carl Ferguson was born in Conyers, Georgia. He was adopted at birth by two parents, who had previously lost three of their four biological children to a house fire. Kennon's birth mother, who already had another son, made a decision to have an abortion, but she arrived at her doctor's office two weeks too late and was told she had to carry the child to full term.

He began playing the drums at age seven, and went on to play drums in high school jazz bands. Later on, he began performing at clubs in the Atlanta, Georgia area, playing cover versions of country and southern rock songs.

In the late 2000s, Kennon self-released an album of his music, which he began selling at his concerts. He then moved to Nashville, Tennessee, where he met Travis Tritt's former manager Gary Falcon, who recommended him to Kyle Lehning, a record producer known for his work with Randy Travis. After Travis recorded Kennon's "Turn It Around" and released it as a single, Kennon was signed to a publishing contract. He also began working with another producer, James Stroud.

Later in 2009, Kennon signed to BamaJam Records in association with Stroudavarious Records (which Stroud owns) and released his debut single "The Call," which he wrote with Jeremy Campbell and Noah Gordon. The song debuted at number 55 on the Billboard Hot Country Songs charts dated for the week of October 17, 2009. Matt Bjorke of Roughstock gave the song a mostly-favorable review, saying that he did not enjoy the song upon first listen because of Kennon's voice, but said that the lyrics are "where it shines."

Kennon's self-titled debut album was released on May 11, 2010. In advance of the album's release, he released a three-song extended play featuring "The Call" and two other songs from the album.

In April 2011, Kennon self-released a second album titled 77.

In October 2012, Kennon self-released a third album titled Makin Music That Matters.

In August 2013, Kennon also released an extended play titled Four on the Floor, which included four new songs and a previously recorded track.

Discography

Studio albums

Extended plays

Singles

Music videos

References

American country singer-songwriters
Living people
R&J Records artists
People from Conyers, Georgia
Country musicians from Georgia (U.S. state)
Year of birth missing (living people)
Singer-songwriters from Georgia (U.S. state)